The Women's junior time trial of the 2015 UCI Road World Championships took place in and around in Richmond, Virginia, United States on September 21, 2015.

American riders finished first and second, as Chloé Dygert won the gold medal by over a minute ahead of Emma White. For the second year in a row, Anna-Leeza Hull finished with the bronze medal, almost 90 seconds down on Dygert's time.

Qualification

All National Federations were allowed to enter four riders for the race, with a maximum of two riders to start. In addition to this number the current continental champions were also able to take part. The outgoing World Champion, Macey Stewart, did not compete as she was no longer eligible to contest junior races.

Course
The junior women rode two laps of the circuit.

The circuit was a technical course that went through the city of Richmond. From the start, the route headed west from downtown to Monument Avenue, a paver-lined, historic boulevard that's been named one of the "10 Great Streets in America." From there, the course made a 180-degree turn at N. Davis Avenue and continued in the opposite direction. The race then cut through the Uptown district before coming back through Virginia Commonwealth University and then crossing the James River. After a technical turnaround, the race came back across the river and worked its way through downtown Richmond, eventually heading up to ascend  on Governor Street. At the top, the riders had to take a sharp left turn onto the false-flat finishing straight,  to the finish.

Schedule
All times are in Eastern Daylight Time (UTC−4).

Participating nations
37 cyclists from 25 nations took part in the women's junior time trial. The numbers of cyclists per nation is shown in parentheses.

 
 
 
 
 
 
 
 
 
 
 
 
 
 
 
 
 
 
 
 
 
 
 
  (host)

Final classification

References

Women's junior time trial
UCI Road World Championships – Women's junior time trial
2015 in women's road cycling